The 2018 Morehead State Eagles football team represented Morehead State University in the 2018 NCAA Division I FCS football season. They were led by sixth-year head coach Rob Tenyer and played their home games at Jayne Stadium. They were members of the Pioneer Football League. They finished the season 3–8, 2–6 in PFL play to finish in a three-way tie for seventh place.

Previous season
The Eagles finished the 2017 season 4–7, 3–5 in PFL play to finish in a tie for eighth place.

Preseason

Preseason All-PFL team
The PFL released their preseason all-PFL team on July 30, 2018, with the Eagles having one player selected.

Offense

Jarin Higginbotham – WR

Preseason coaches poll
The PFL released their preseason coaches poll on July 31, 2018, with the Eagles predicted to finish in eighth place.

Schedule

Game summaries

at Eastern Kentucky

Mount St. Joseph

Austin Peay

at Butler

San Diego

at Davidson

Valparaiso

Marist

at Stetson

at Dayton

Drake

References

Morehead State
Morehead State Eagles football seasons
Morehead State Eagles football